Freestyle MetalX is an extreme sports video game developed by British developer Deibus Studios and released in 2003 by Midway Games for PlayStation 2, GameCube and Xbox. It is a 3D motorcycle stunt game that rewards the player for pulling off difficult moves.

The game's soundtrack to the game consists of hard rock and metal music, including bands such as Megadeth, Mötley Crüe, Motörhead, and Grade 8.

Reception 

The game received "average" reviews on all platforms according to the review aggregation website Metacritic.

References

External links 
 

2003 video games
PlayStation 2 games
GameCube games
Xbox games
Motorcycle video games
Midway video games
Video games developed in the United Kingdom